Mara Balls (real name Maria Mattila, born 1983) is a Finnish singer-songwriter, rock guitarist, and artist. She was the bassist of Jukka ja Jytämimmit. After the band broke up, she set up her own band with bassist Aapo Palonen and drummer Antti Palmu.

Mattila received the Newcomer of the Year Award at the Finnish Blues Awards gala. She has also been active developing city culture, for which the city of Tampere awarded her 2014.

Discography

With Jukka ja Jytämimmit
 Jytää vaan (2015, Keltaiset Levyt)

As Mara Balls
 Vuorten taa (2016, Maran Lafka/Stupido Records)
 Elävä kivi (2017, Maran Lafka/Stupido Records)
 Maranormaali ilmiö (2022)

References

External links
 Mara Balls homepage

Finnish women musicians
Finnish women singer-songwriters
Finnish rock guitarists
Finnish bass guitarists
Women bass guitarists
Finnish artists
1983 births
Living people
21st-century Finnish  women singers
21st-century bass guitarists